Madison Creek Falls is located within the Olympic National Park near the Elwha River, west of Port Angeles, Washington.  The falls is about 50 feet high and has a light flow in a horsetail shape.  Another higher falls is located above the first, but is completely inaccessible. The paved trail to the falls is very short (less than 100 meters) and is wheelchair accessible.

References  

Waterfalls of Washington (state)
Landforms of Clallam County, Washington
Landforms of Olympic National Park